A Tear and a Smile may refer to:

 A Tear and a Smile (book) by Kahlil Gibran, first published in Arabic, 1914
 A Tear and a Smile (Tír na nÓg album), 1972
 A Tear and a Smile (Linda Lewis album), 1982